Tagichinor ( or ; , Yaghnobi Роԝут Rowut, Роԝт or Таги Чанор, Таги Чинор) is a village in Sughd Region, northwestern Tajikistan. It is part of the jamoat Anzob in the Ayni District. Its population was 32 people (2017; 18 in 2007).

The name means "under the sycamore tree". It is situated above the right, northern bank of the River Yaghnob.

References

Populated places in Sughd Region
Yaghnob